Larry Young (also known as Khalid Yasin [Abdul Aziz]; October 7, 1940 – March 30, 1978) was an American jazz organist and occasional pianist. Young's early work was strongly influenced by the soul jazz of Jimmy Smith, but he later pioneered a more experimental, modal approach to the Hammond B-3.

Biography
Born and raised in Newark, New Jersey, United States, Young attended Newark Arts High School, where he began performing with a vocal group and a jazz band.

Young played with various R&B bands in the 1950s, before gaining jazz experience with Jimmy Forrest, Lou Donaldson, Kenny Dorham, Hank Mobley and Tommy Turrentine. Recording as a leader for Prestige from 1960, Young made a number of soul jazz discs, Testifying, Young Blues and Groove Street. When Young signed with Blue Note around 1964, his music began to show the marked influence of John Coltrane. In this period, he produced his most enduring work. He recorded several times as part of a trio with guitarist Grant Green and drummer Elvin Jones, who were occasionally augmented by additional players.  Most of these albums were released under Green's name, though Into Somethin' (with Sam Rivers on saxophone) became Young's Blue Note debut. Unity, recorded in 1965, remains his best-known album; it features a front line of Joe Henderson and the young Woody Shaw. Subsequent albums for Blue Note (Contrasts, Of Love and Peace, Heaven On Earth, Mother Ship) also drew on elements of the 1960s avant-garde and utilised local musicians from Young's hometown of Newark. Young then became a part of some of the earliest fusion groups: first on Emergency! with the Tony Williams Lifetime (with Tony Williams and John McLaughlin) and also on Miles Davis's Bitches Brew. His sound with Lifetime was made distinctive by his often very percussive approach and regular heavy use of guitar and synthesizer-like effects. He is also known for a jam he recorded with rock guitarist Jimi Hendrix, which was released after Hendrix's death on the album, Nine to the Universe.

In March 1978, he checked into the hospital for stomach pains. He died there on March 30, 1978, while being treated for what is said to be pneumonia. However, the actual cause of his death is unclear.

Discography

As leader 
 Testifying (New Jazz, 1960)
 Young Blues (New Jazz, 1960)
 Groove Street (Prestige, 1962)
 Into Somethin' (Blue Note, 1965) – recorded in 1964
 Unity (Blue Note, 1966) – recorded in 1965
 Of Love and Peace (Blue Note, 1967) – recorded in 1966
 Contrasts (Blue Note, 1968) – recorded in 1967
 Heaven on Earth (Blue Note, 1969) – recorded in 1968
 Lawrence of Newark (Perception, 1975) – recorded in 1973
 Fuel (Arista, 1975)
 Spaceball (Arista, 1976)
 The Magician (Acanta/Bellaphon, 1977)
 Mother Ship (Blue Note, 1980) – recorded in 1969
 Larry Young in Paris: The ORTF Sessions (Resonance, 2016) - recorded for French radio in 1964 and 1965

As sideman 

With Joe Chambers
 Double Exposure (Muse, 1978) – recorded in 1977

With Miles Davis
 Bitches Brew (Columbia, 1970) – recorded in 1969
 Big Fun (Columbia, 1974) – 1969 sessions only

With Jimmy Forrest
 Forrest Fire (New Jazz, 1960)

With Grant Green
 Talkin' About! (Blue Note, 1965) – recorded in 1964
 His Majesty King Funk (Verve, 1965)
 I Want to Hold Your Hand (Blue Note, 1966) – recorded in 1965
 Street of Dreams (Blue Note, 1967) – recorded in 1964

With Etta Jones
 Love Shout (Prestige, 1963) – recorded in 1962-63

With Gildo Mahones
 I'm Shooting High (Prestige, 1964) – recorded in 1963
 The Great Gildo (Prestige, 1965) – recorded in 1963-64

With John McLaughlin
 Devotion (Douglas, 1970)
 Love Devotion Surrender with Carlos Santana (Columbia, 1972)

With Pony Poindexter and Booker Ervin
 Gumbo! (Prestige, 1963) - with bonus tracks on CD

With Woody Shaw
 In the Beginning (Muse, 1983) - recorded in 1965. also released as Cassandranite.

With Thornel Schwartz and Bill Leslie
 Soul Cookin' (Argo, 1962) - Young listed as "Lawrence Olds"

With Buddy Terry
 Natural Soul (Prestige, 1968) – recorded in 1967

With The Tony Williams Lifetime
 Emergency (Polydor, 1969)
 Turn It Over (Polydor, 1970)
 Ego (Polydor, 1971)

With Love Cry Want (Nicholas/Gallivan/Young)
 Love Cry Want (Newjazz.com, 1997) - recorded in 1972

References

Further reading
 Lass, Don (February 10, 1974). "Record Previews: Lawrence of Newark". Asbury Park Press.
 News staff (September 10, 1975). "A Bright New Jazz Organist Emerges". New York Amsterdam News.

External links

'Unity: Larry Young and Black Music, from Soul Jazz to Free to Fusion' at Point of Departure

1940 births
1978 deaths
African-American jazz musicians
American jazz organists
American male organists
Hard bop organists
Jazz-funk organists
Modal jazz organists
Musicians from Newark, New Jersey
Post-bop organists
Soul-jazz organists
Blue Note Records artists
Prestige Records artists
Arista Records artists
Avant-garde jazz organists
20th-century American keyboardists
The Tony Williams Lifetime members
20th-century organists
20th-century American male musicians
American male jazz musicians
Newark Arts High School alumni